James Reed Miller (February 29, 1880 – December 29, 1923), who recorded as Reed Miller and as James Reed, was an American tenor who had an active career as a concert and oratorio singer during the first quarter of the 20th century. He possessed a beautiful warm lyrical voice that was very expressive.

Biography
James Reed Miller was born in South Carolina on February 29, 1880. His parents were George Washington Miller (1837–1892) and Emmala Thompson Miller (née Reed; 1839–1893). He was the youngest of five children; his siblings were William Nicholas (1869–1922), George Augustus (1871–1941), Caroline Hammond (1873–1961), and Mary Yarborough (1873–1965).

Miller began his career as a soloist in churches in New York City where he achieved a high reputation. He began appearing at major music festivals throughout the United States in the first decade of the 20th century. He was married to contralto Nevada Van der Veer (1870-1958). Along with his wife, soprano Agnes Kimball and bass-baritone Frank Croxton, Miller toured the United States in the Croxton Quartet. He was also a member of the Columbia Stellar Quartet.

Miller is best remembered today for his contributions to the early days of recorded music. Unlike many other recordings of his time, his are of a high musical level. His earliest known record dates to 1905 on Edison Records. He went on to make recordings through 1923 with Columbia Records, Edison Records (Amberola plates and cylinders), Pathé Records, Rainbow Records, Rex Records, Vocalion Records, and the Victor Talking Machine Company. He also made recordings with the Croxton Quartet for Edison and recorded several duets with Frederick Wheeler (under the names of "James Reed & James F. Harrison" ) for Victor.

References

External links
 Reed Miller recordings at the Discography of American Historical Recordings.

1880 births
1923 deaths
American operatic tenors
20th-century American male singers
20th-century American singers
Singers from New York City
Classical musicians from New York (state)